James Davidson (November 1, 1856 – October 6, 1913) was mayor of Ottawa, Ontario, Canada in 1901.

He was born in Ottawa in 1856. With his brothers, he worked in the timber trade and manufactured doors. He served as alderman from 1898 to 1907; he became mayor when W.D. Morris was forced to resign. Davidson was replaced by Fred Cook two months later.

He died in Ottawa of a heart attack in 1913 and was buried in the Beechwood Cemetery.

References 

Chain of Office: Biographical Sketches of the Early Mayors of Ottawa (1847-1948), Dave Mullington

1856 births
1913 deaths
Mayors of Ottawa